Klinefelter is a German surname, which is a variant of Kleinfelder. This is a topographic name for a person who worked a smallholding, or a locational surname for a person from one of the places called Kleinfeld in Germany. The name may refer to:

Harry Klinefelter (1912–1990), an American endocrinologist
Klinefelter syndrome
Kleinfeltersville, Pennsylvania

See also
Kleinfeld

References

German-language surnames